Edward Wolley was an Anglican bishop in Ireland in the 17th century; he succeeded William Bailey as Bishop of Clonfert and Kilmacduagh in 1664, and died in 1684.

References

Bishops of Clonfert and Kilmacduagh
Clergy from Shrewsbury
Alumni of St John's College, Cambridge
Year of birth missing
1684 deaths
17th-century Anglican bishops in Ireland